Thampan is the name of Kshatriya clan from the state of Kerala in India.

Etymology
The word Thampanot Thampran is a contraction of the term Thampuran which is a corrupt version of the Sanskrit term Samrat and stands for Your Lordship. The title of Varma is some times affixed to the name of a Thampan. In Travancore, Thampans, along with the Thirumulpads form a part of the third tier of Royalty, after the Koil Thampurans who form the first tier and the Rajas who form the second tier. In North Malabar, most prominent of the Thampans are the sons of the Nileshwaram Rajahs, who form a part of the Kiryathil Nair caste.

Occupation
The Thampans were once ruling classes but by the 17th century they became vassals to other kings – mainly the three large kingdoms of Travancore, Kochi and Kozhikode.

General customs
The customs of the Thampans are same like the Rajahs of Kerala. They are invested with the sacred thread at the age of sixteen and are allowed to recite the Gayatri incantation ten times, thrice a day. Birth and Death pollutions are observed for eleven days. Namboodiri Brahmins are the priests of the Thampans. The Thali Kettu Kalyanam ceremony for girls, which is the actual marriage ceremony, takes place between the ages of seven and fourteen and Brahmins of a class called Aryapattar tie the Thali while Vedic hymns are chanted by the Namboodiri Brahmins.

References

 Travancore State Manual
 Travancore Census Report, 1901

Social groups of India
Indian castes
Kerala society
Nair